Chalderaz-e Esfandiyar (also Romanized as Chālderāz-e Esfandīyār) is a village in Barez Rural District, Manj District, Lordegan County, Chaharmahal and Bakhtiari Province, Iran. At the 2006 census, its population was 86, in 15 families.

References 

Populated places in Lordegan County